Johnnie Fingers (born John Peter Moylett, 10 September 1956) is an Irish keyboardist and co-founding member of the new wave band The Boomtown Rats. He was notable for his attire of striped pyjamas on stage and his melodic piano style.

Background
Fingers came from a large family of actors, artists and musicians. His cousin is his fellow Boomtown Rat Pete Briquette, as their mothers, Margaret "Peggy" (Bowles) Cusack and Cecilia "Sheila" (Bowles) Moylett, were sisters. They are nephews of Irish conductor and composer Michael Bowles. He learned the piano from a young age from "Miss Grist" who he claims "stole his youth". After the demise of the Boomtown Rats in 1986, he founded Gung~Ho with his fellow Boomtown Rats member Simon Crowe and Yoko Kurokawa in 1987. Fingers is now married with two children. Fingers decided to not return to the Boomtown Rats when the band was reunited in 2013, as he lives in Tokyo.

Career
He currently lives in Tokyo, Japan, where he continues to work in the music industry. Apart from producing and writing music for Japanese stars such as UA, and theme songs such as for the hit anime B't X, Fingers is the "point man" with the concert music production company Smash Japan, producers of Fuji Rock Festival, the largest music festival in Japan.

Discography

With The Boomtown Rats

With Gung~ho
 "Play To Win" (single, 1987)
 10 (1988)

With Greengate 
"Daydreaming" - Vinyl 7" 
Metaphysical Vibration - CD

With Ruffy Tuffy
 Ruffy Tuffy (1999) album
 Respect! (2000) omnibus Live album
 Natsu no Jujika (2000) album
 Aki no Jujika (2000) album
 Mizu no Awa (2001) EP

References

Living people
1956 births
Irish pianists
Irish rock musicians
Irish songwriters
Irish record producers
Irish expatriates in Japan
Irish DJs
Irish new wave musicians
The Boomtown Rats members
Electronic dance music DJs
21st-century pianists